WZXR (99.3 FM) is a rock music formatted radio station licensed to serve Williamsport, Pennsylvania. The station is owned by Van A. Michael, through licensee Backyard Broadcasting of Pennsylvania LLC. The station bills itself as "Susquehanna Valley's Home of Rock and Roll".

Notable on air personalities include The Bob and Tom Show, John Finn, Ian Emerson, and Mike Matthews. Programming includes Flashback, In The Studio, Dee Snider's The House of Hair, and WZXR is also a member of the Pittsburgh Steelers Football Network.

WZXR was launched in September 1991 with the song "Long Live Rock" by The Who and air-personality Bubba (Dan Bozyk).

See also
 WCXR

External links

ZXR
Lycoming County, Pennsylvania
Radio stations established in 1991
1991 establishments in Pennsylvania